Peavey may refer to:

 Peavey (surname)
 Peavey (tool), a logging tool
 Peavey Electronics, an American audio equipment manufacturer
 Peavey Company, a former name of Gavilon, an American commodity management firm

See also
 Peavy (disambiguation)
 
 
 Pee Vee (disambiguation)
 Pee Wee (disambiguation)
 PV (disambiguation)